The American Medical Bureau (AMB), also known as the American Medical Bureau to Save Spanish Democracy, was a humanitarian aid institution associated to the Lincoln Battalion, providing a medical corps, nursing systems for casualties, as well as accommodation and treatment to those who were wounded on the Spanish Republican side of the battlefield in the Spanish Civil War (1936–1939).

History
Organized by Dr. Edward K. Barsky, the American Medical Bureau recruited doctors, dentists, nurses, administrators and ambulance drivers to support the Spanish Republic. In its fund raising events the AMB used the names 'American Medical Bureau to Save Spanish Democracy' and 'Medical Bureau & North American Committee to Aid Spanish Democracy' as well.

In the United States the AMB also staged events in order to try to shift public opinion away from supporting the aid boycott to the Spanish Republic imposed by the American government following the agreements of the Non-intervention Committee. In Spain the AMB was assigned to hospitals and medical centers of the Spanish Military Medical Services (Cuerpo de Sanidad), mainly at the Gómez Ulla Military Hospital in Madrid, and also to front-line locations. AMB members, who also included women, treated both international as well as Spanish combatants.

By the end of the war a majority of both the Spanish aid committees and the leadership councils of the AMB were women.  Many women leaders in the aid movement were wives of either prominent American leftists or soldiers in the Lincoln Battalion.  Katherine Duncan, wife to Governor LaFollette's secretary, and Peggy Dennis, a communist party leader, were leaders in the active Madison, Wisconsin chapter.  Marion Merriman, wife to Abraham Lincoln Battalion commander Robert Merriman (the supposed inspiration of Ernest Hemingway's hero in For Whom the Bell Tolls), was the chairwoman of the large San Francisco branch of the organization.  She and one other woman, Fredericka Martin, hold the honour of being the only woman to receive officer commissions from the Spanish Republic.  Evelyn Hutchins, an active member of the AMB, agitated for years to be a hospital driver on the front-lines, but Spanish Republican policies prevented women from serving on the front-line until 1938 when Hutchins won the right to serve on the front-line as a driver.

See also
International Brigades
Spanish Republican Army
Yankee Squadron
Lincoln Battalion
Military history of African Americans
XV International Brigade

Bibliography
 Jane Pacht Brickman, "Medical McCarthyism and the Punishment of Internationalist Physicians in the United States," in Anne-Emanuelle Birn and Theodore M. Brown (eds.), Comrades in Health: US Health Internationalists, Abroad and at Home. New Brunswick, NJ: Rutgers University Press, 2013; pp. 82–100.
 Peter N. Carroll, The Odyssey of the Abraham Lincoln Brigade: Americans in the Spanish Civil War. Stanford, CA: Stanford University Press, 1994.
 Walter J. Lear, "American Medical Support for Spanish Democracy, 1936-1938," in Anne-Emanuelle Birn and Theodore M. Brown (eds.), Comrades in Health: US Health Internationalists, Abroad and at Home. New Brunswick, NJ: Rutgers University Press, 2013; pp. 65–81.

References

External links 
 The Volunteer, the quarterly journal of the Abraham Lincoln Brigade Archives
 Some Men Put Up Their Lives
 List of Abraham Lincoln Brigade Volunteers New York University Robert F. Wagner Labor Archives
 Online guide to the archives of the Lincoln Brigade, Tamiment Library (New York).
 Photograph of Dr. Arnold Donowa posed with American Medical Bureau to Save Spanish Democracy vehicle
 The Journey of James Neugass

Anti-fascist organizations in the United States
Military units and formations established in 1936
Military units and formations disestablished in 1939
African-American history of the United States military
Humanitarian aid organizations
International Brigades
Organisations of the Spanish Civil War
Spain–United States relations